Weston High School is a public high school in Weston, Connecticut, serving about 800 students in grades 9–12.

The  Class of 2008 had the highest CAPT scores in the state in 2006.
In 2013 Weston High School was put on the National Blue Ribbon Schools Program list.
For the purpose of comparison with the achievement levels of similar schools, the state Department of Education classifies schools and communities in "District Reference Groups", defined  as "districts whose students' families are similar in education, income, occupation and need, and that have roughly similar enrollment". Weston is one of eight school districts in District Reference Group A (others are Darien, Easton, New Canaan, Redding, Ridgefield, Westport, and Wilton).

The school is fully accredited by the New England Association of Schools and Colleges.

Notable alumni
Jared Cohen is a nonfiction author, Rhodes scholar, and the youngest member of the Secretary of State's Policy Planning Staff.
Kyle Dunnigan is a comedian who has appeared on Comedy Central, Cedric the Entertainer Presents, Reno 911!, Late Night with Conan O'Brien, Jimmy Kimmel Live!, and The Late Late Show with Craig Ferguson.
Hans Niemann is a teenage chess grandmaster.
Jacob Pitts is an actor who has appeared in prominent films such as Eurotrip, Across The Universe, and 21.
Jamey Richard is an NFL player who was drafted by the Indianapolis Colts in the 7th round with the 236th pick in the 2008 NFL Draft.
Theodora Richards and Alexandra Richards are international models and the children of Rolling Stone Keith Richards, and graduated in 2003 and 2004.
Jonathan W. Stokes is a screenwriter who has written for notable actors such as Jeremy Renner, Will Smith, and Hugh Jackman.
Erik Weihenmayer is an American athlete, adventurer, author, activist and motivational speaker, and the first blind person to reach the summit of Mount Everest, on May 25, 2001.

References

Weston, Connecticut
Public high schools in Connecticut
Educational institutions established in 1968
Schools in Fairfield County, Connecticut
1968 establishments in Connecticut
Buildings and structures in Weston, Connecticut